Francis Willford Fitzpatrick (April 9, 1863 – July 10, 1931) was an architect in Duluth, Minnesota, Washington, DC, Omaha, Nebraska, and Evanston, Illinois. He often abbreviated his name as F. W. Fitzpatrick in publications and correspondence. Fitzpatrick was an early advocate of fireproof buildings, and he was a frequent columnist in architectural trade publications on a variety of topics.

Early life
Fitzpatrick was born in Montreal, Quebec, Canada, on April 9, 1863. His parents were John and Mary Fitzpatrick. He immigrated to the United States in 1883 and began working as a drafter in the office of Minneapolis architect Leroy Buffington, remaining until 1887. Then in 1888, Fitzpatrick worked at the offices of the brothers Fremont D. Orff and George W. Orff. He formed the Minnesota Decorating Company and successfully contracted for the interior painting and decorating of the 107-room Dacotah Hotel in Grand Forks, North Dakota in 1889.

He joined the American Institute of Architects in 1889.

Traphagen and Fitzpatrick
After completing his work at the Dacotah Hotel, Fitzpatrick moved to Duluth, Minnesota, and formed a partnership, Traphagen and Fitzpatrick, with Oliver G. Traphagen that lasted from 1890 to 1896. This was his most productive time as an architect. Noted Duluth architect Frederick German worked for the two as a draftsman at this time.

List of Traphagen and Fitzpatrick designs

Phoenix Block, 1890
Fitger Brewery Boiler House, 1890
A W. Wieland Store, 1890
Hoppmann Building, 1890
Lester Park Hotel, 1890
Philadelphia Terrace (townhouses), 1890
Chester Terrace (townhouses), 1890
Clinton & Kate Markell House, 1890
Alonzo & Julia Whiteman House, 1890
Costello Block (second), 1891
Lyceum Theater, 1891
First Presbyterian Church, 1891
Incline Pavilion, 1891
Duluth Shoe Co./Duluth Dry Goods Co., 1891
Selleck Block, 1891
Charlotte Wells Store, 1891
Hardy Hall, 1891
James Norton Rental Houses (2), 1891
Alexander Miles Rental Houses (6), 1891
Henry & Lizzie Blume House, 1891
Torrey Building, 1892
Boyle Brothers Saloon & Restaurant, 1892
Duluth Street Railway Co. Barn, 1892
Duluth Driving Park, 1892
Myron & Mary Bunnell House, 1892
William & Josephine Magie House, 1892
Oliver & Amelia Traphagen House, 1892
Munger Terrace (townhouses), 1892
Townsend & Mayme Hoopes House, 1892
William & Amelia Sherwood House, 1892
Charles & Maude Towne House, 1892
Herald Building, 1893
Mesaba Block, 1893
Stone-Ordean Warehouse, 1893
St. Louis Hotel (second), 1893
Sagar Drug, 1893
Hamilton & Martha Peyton House, 1893
Charles & Louise Schiller House, 1893
George & Jessica Spencer House, 1893
Crane Ordway Building, 1894
Elmer & Lizzie Matter House, 1894
Board of Trade Building (second), 1895
Tuohy Mercantile, 1895
P.R. L. Hardenbergh & Co. Building, 1895
Fitger's Brewery Settling Room, 1896

The partnership ended in 1896 when Traphagan relocated to Hawaii and Fitzpatrick moved to Washington, D.C.

Chicago Federal Building
In 1896 Fitzpatrick accepted a position as assistant to the Supervising Architect at the United States Treasury. Prior to the Tarsney Act of 1893, federal buildings were designed by architects at the treasury. Fitzpatrick entered government service at a time when federal architects were becoming advisors and supervisors on federal building contracts with design work more in the hands of private architects. At the treasury, Fitzpatrick worked for Jeremiah O'Rourke and then for William Aiken. Fitzpatrick was assigned to the Chicago Federal Building project as an assistant to architect Henry Ives Cobb, and he moved to Chicago to become one of many supervisors of construction. Soon Fitzpatrick was the only supervisor of construction, and his relationship with Cobb deteriorated for reasons of procurement and process related to construction. Fitzpatrick resigned from the project in 1903 and returned to private practice two years before the building was completed.

Private practice
Fitzpatrick became a consulting architect in 1903, and he specialized in fire prevention designs. He also worked with other architects to solve design problems. His favorite area of expertise may have been Architectural rendering, and he enjoyed submitting drawings for competition awards.

By 1917, Fitzpatrick joined the Bankers Realty Investment Company in Omaha, Nebraska as head of the architectural department. The company designed and built residential and commercial structures capitalized by investors. While at Bankers, he designed the Hotel Yancey in Grand Island, Nebraska, the Blackstone Hotel in Omaha, and a hotel in Sioux City, Iowa. The job did not last long, and in 1919 Fitzpatrick moved to Evanston, Illinois and continued as a consulting architect.

Invention of the skyscraper
An editorial in the June 22, 1907, issue of The American Architect and Building News reported that three architects had claimed credit for inventing the skyscraper:
Leroy Buffington for the 1884 Minneapolis Tribune Building
William Le Baron Jenney for the 1884 Home Insurance Building and
Bradford Lee Gilbert for the 1889 Tower Building

The editorial stated that in the opinion of the American Institute of Architects (AIA), Jenny had the better claim, although his design was similar to the framing of an 1856 shot tower in the great swamp of New York City.

The July 13, 1907, issue of The American Architect and Building News contained a letter from F. W. Fitzpatrick refuting the conclusions of the AIA titled, "The Origination of the Steel Skeleton Idea." In his letter, Fitzpatrick claimed that he himself had designed steel skeletons in support of church towers prior to 1883, and he had sketched the steel column and horizontal beam design for Buffington's 12-story Tribune building when he was working for Buffington in 1883.

Then in 1912, an article in The Washington Post credited Fitzpatrick with inventing the skyscraper. Claims about Fitzpatrick's role in early skyscraper design were not actively contested, but the opinion of the AIA may have been more accurate.

Ideas, opinions, and quotations
Fitzpatrick was a frequent contributor to various trade publications and newspapers. In his research, historic preservationist Ed Zimmer counted over 200 articles and letters to the editor by Fitzpatrick on architecture and other topics. Fitzpatrick's style was frequently grandiloquent and passionate, but his vision was often accurate.

On the United States Capitol Building,

On progress,

On government,

A poem on China,

On Social Security (postal insurance),

On the handwriting of President Cleveland,

On corruption at City Hall,

On the use of concrete in construction,

On step-back construction in urban planning,

On plate glass,

On the Lincoln Memorial,

On the boring work of fellow architects,

On the invention of the skyscraper,

Death
While crossing the street in Evanston, Fitzpatrick was fatally struck by a car on July 10, 1931. An obituary at the time described his life,

References

External links

"One sweet résumé" A list of Duluth buildings by Traphagen and Fitzpatrick with a drawing of the Lyceum Theater
Francis W. Fitzpatrick A presentation by Ed Zimmer for the Preservation Association of Lincoln, Nebraska

1863 births
1931 deaths
19th-century Canadian architects
19th-century American architects
20th-century American architects
Architects from Montreal
Canadian emigrants to the United States
People from Minneapolis